"macs" is a science fiction short story by  American writer Terry Bisson, published in 1999.

The story consists entirely of dialogue between several people and an investigator. The people are telling the investigator about clones that were used to satisfy the Victims’ Rights Closure Settlement – wherein people get a clone of the person who was responsible for the death of their loved ones.

"macs" won the 2000 Locus Award for Best Short Story and Nebula Award for Best Short Story, and was a finalist for the 2000 Hugo Award for Best Short Story.

References

1999 short stories
Short stories by Terry Bisson
Works originally published in The Magazine of Fantasy & Science Fiction
Nebula Award for Best Short Story-winning works